The 1922 United States Senate election in Missouri was held on November 7, 1922. Incumbent Democratic U.S. Senator James A. Reed was re-elected to a third term over Republican R. R. Brewster.

Democratic primary

Candidates
Breckinridge Long, Third Assistant Secretary of State for Asian Affairs in the Woodrow Wilson administration and nominee for U.S. Senate in 1920
James A. Reed, incumbent Senator since 1911
Robert I. Young

Results

Republican primary

Candidates
Jesse W. Barrett, Missouri Attorney General
Sterling P. Bond, Democratic candidate for Senate in 1910
R. R. Brewster
John C. McKinley, former Lieutenant Governor of Missouri (1905–09)
David M. Proctor, candidate for U.S. Senate in 1920
John H. Parker
William Sacks

Results

General election

Results

See also
1922 United States Senate elections
List of United States senators from Missouri

References

1922
Missouri
United States Senate